Jagiellońska Street (Polish: Ulica Jagiellońska) - a historic street in Kraków, Poland. The street intersects the former Jagiellonian University quarter. The street features the Collegium Maius of the Jagiellonian University and the Old Theatre. Jagiellońska Street is situated to the east of Planty Park.

Features

References

Streets in Kraków
Kraków